Broadlane is a hamlet in the parish of Breage, Cornwall, England.

References

Hamlets in Cornwall